Younotus, stylized as YouNotUs, is a German DJ and producer duo from Berlin, made up of Tobias Bogdon and Gregor Sahm.

In 2015, they were featured alongside Alle Farben on the Anna Naklab pan-European hit "Supergirl", a cover of Reamonn that reached number 1 in Austria and number 2 in Germany. In 2016, they were featured on "Please Tell Rosie" by German DJ/producer Alle Farben, which peaked at number 2 in Austria and number 3 in Germany and earned the artist a nomination for "Best Single" for the 1LIVE Krone radio award. After another collaboration with Alle Farben and Kelvin Jones named "Only Thing We Know" in 2018, they released a cover of Liquido's 90s tophit "Narcotic" together with Janieck and Senex who was former frontman of Liquido.

In 2019, they were nominated for the German radio award 1LIVE Krone in the category "Best Dance Act". To end the year the duo played in front of a huge international crowd at the official New Year's Eve party at Berlin's Brandenburg Gate.

Discography

Singles

As lead artist

As featured artist

Remixes

Notes

References

External links 
Official website
Facebook

German DJs
German record producers
Electronic dance music duos
Remixers